Blueprint for Discovery is the only album recorded by producer and arranger Jerry Peters. It was released in 1972 and co-produced by Peters, Keg Johnson and Richard Aaron for Organic Sound Productions.

Track listing
All tracks composed by Jerry Peters; except where indicated.
"If You Leave Me Now (Prologue)"   	1:26
"If You Leave Me Now"  4:23
"Long Before You and I"  	4:12
"Did I Step On Your Heart" 	3:06
"Going In Circles"  (Jerry Peters, Anita Poree) 	8:14
"Love Song"  (Lesley Duncan) 	5:30
"White Shutters"  4:33
"Kuri Monga Nuie (Big Black Dog)"  (B. Cole) 	5:37
"Lest We Forget" 	6:52

Personnel
Jerry Peters - vocals, keyboards, arrangements 
Harvey Mason - drums, percussion
Wayne Douglas - bass
Dean Parks - guitar
Arthur Adams - guitar
Joseph Porcaro - drums, percussion
Bobbye Hall - conga
Mike G. Altschul - saxophone
Larry McGuire - trumpet,  flugelhorn
Ernie Watts - tenor saxophone, soprano saxophone 
David N. Crawford - flute, alto flute
Stephanie Spruill, Patrice Holloway, Venetta Fields, Maxine Willard Waters, Jessica Shux, Annesther Shux, Brandy Shux, Dianna Shux, Maria Shux  - background vocals
Janice A. Gower - violin
Charles Veal, Jr. - violin
Rollice Dale - viola
Ronald Cooper - cello

External links
 

1972 debut albums
Soul albums by American artists
Funk albums by American artists
Mercury Records albums
Albums produced by Jerry Peters